Joey Hanssen (Venray, 1 July 1991) is a Dutch racing driver. He currently races in the CIK Stars of Karting Series in the KZ2 class.

Career history

Karting
Joey started kart racing competitively in 1997. He raced under the NAB-NFK sanctioning body, which then organized the official Dutch karting championships. He won his first title in 2003 in the Junior ICA class. In the Dutch championship Junior ICA, Joey finished second. At 15 years old he stepped over to the shifter karts. Until 2008 Joey had raced mainly in the Netherlands. In 2008 Joey would compete in the DSKM in Germany. He also competed in the WSK International Series and the European championship KZ2. This resulted in a tenth place in the DSKM, a twelfth place in the WSK International Series and a sixth place at the European championship.

Auto racing
In 2007 Joey made his debut in formula racing. The Formula Gloria was an amateur spec racing class, it is based on the Formula Azzurra. Joey finished second in the first race and won the second race. Eventually Joey went on to win six out of nine races and securing the championship. As a reward for winning the championship Joey competed in two races of the Formula Azzurra championship at the Autodromo Nazionale Monza. Joey finished fourth in the first race and seventh in the second race.

Joey also made his touring car racing debut in 2007, in the BRL Light. The first race for Joey was at the TT Circuit Assen halfway through the season. The BRL Light held two support races during 2007 Bavaria Champ Car Grand Prix weekend. Joey won the second race for a crowd of 61,200 fans. For 2008 Joey failed to secure a full-time race seat. Instead he focused on karting. He raced one race weekend in the Dutch Formula Ford 1800 winning both races. Joey also focused on 2009 for which he secured a full-time race seat in the NASCAR Canadian Tire Series. His seat was funded by lifelong sponsor Primechamp, one of the largest producers of mushrooms in the Netherlands.

In 2009 Joey raced a Dodge Avenger for DJK Racing. He made his oval debut at Autodrome St. Eustache where he finished fifteenth and was the last car running. He achieved his best result at Barrie Speedway he started the race nineteenth but finished in eighth position. Whole season long fellow rookie Dexter Stacey was his main rival fighting for top rookie honors. By finishing way in front of Stacey in the final round at Kawartha Speedway, Joey Hanssen secured the rookie title. Joey Hanssen finished thirteenth in the final standings just in front of Dexter Stacey who was fourteenth.

Return to kartracing
After failing to secure an autoracing seat for 2010, Joey returned to kartracing halfway through the season. He drove in the KZ2 class in a Lenzo Kart. The following year, 2011, Hanssen was signed by the Lenzo Kart factory team Luxor Racing Team. His biggest achievement was to win the CIK-FIA World Cup for KZ2. In 2012 Joey returned to the DSKM championship securing a fourth place in the championship. Driving for Lenzo Kart Australia Joey moved to Australia to race in the CIK Stars of Karting Series in the KZ2 class. Winning the 2013 Stars of Karting in 2013 and 2014 with the famous CRG-Shamick racing Team. Hanssen moved back to the Netherlands. Where he continued Stacking up Championships. Winning the 2017 ,2018 and 2019 Dutch KZ2 Championship With his home build Engines. Hanssen retired at the end of the 2019 season and started his own kart team specialized in KZ.

Motorsports career results

NASCAR
(key) (Bold – Pole position awarded by qualifying time. Italics – Pole position earned by points standings or practice time. * – Most laps led.)

Canadian Tire Series

References

External links
 
 Career statistics at DriverDB.com
 Joey Hanssen's profile at NASCAR Hometracks

Living people
1991 births
People from Venray
Dutch racing drivers
NASCAR drivers
Sportspeople from Limburg (Netherlands)